The 1975–76 Israel State Cup (Gvia HaMedina) was the 37th season of Israel's nationwide football cup competition and the 22nd after the Israeli Declaration of Independence.

The competition was won by Beitar Jerusalem, who have beaten Maccabi Tel Aviv 2–1 (in extra time) at the final.

Format Changes
After 3 seasons of playing two-legged, home and away, ties, the IFA decided to revert the competition to its old format of one-legged ties.

Results

First round

Second round

Third round

Fourth round

Round of 16

Quarter-finals

Semi-finals

Final

Notes

References
100 Years of Football 1906-2006, Elisha Shohat (Israel), 2006, pp. 238-239
Nes Tziona conceded five from Kiryat Ono (Page 3) Hadshot HaSport, 14.9.1975, archive.football.co.il 
Cup (Page 3) Hadshot HaSport, 21.9.1975, archive.football.co.il 
Kabilio entered on time (Page 2) Hadshot HaSport, 5.10.1975, archive.football.co.il 
Cup (Page 3) Hadshot HaSport, 12.10.1975, archive.football.co.il 
Cup (Pages 2-3) Hadshot HaSport, 5.11.1975, archive.football.co.il 
Cup (Pages 2, 4) Hadshot HaSport, 6.11.1975, archive.football.co.il 

Israel State Cup
State Cup
Israel State Cup seasons